Jerry Schuplinski (born April 4, 1977) is an American football coach who is the tight ends coach for the Las Vegas Raiders of the National Football League. Jerry was an assistant coach for Case Western Reserve for six seasons before becoming a part of the Patriots' staff in 2013. Schuplinski was part of the Patriots coaching staff that won Super Bowl LI. In the game, the Patriots defeated the Atlanta Falcons by a score of 34–28 in overtime.

Coaching career

John Carroll
In 2000, Schuplinski was hired at John Carroll as a graduate assistant.

Trinity High School
In 2002, Schuplinski was hired as the head coach of Trinity High School. He was also a math teacher and the athletic director there.

Case Western Reserve
In 2007, Schuplinski was hired as the special teams coordinator and linebackers coach for Case Western Reserve under head coach Greg Debeljak.

New England Patriots
In 2013, Schuplinski was hired by the New England Patriots as an offensive assistant under head coach Bill Belichick. This was because Schuplinski, Patriots' offensive coordinator Josh McDaniels and Patriots' director of player personnel Nick Caserio played together at John Carroll University in the mid-1990s. He won his first Super Bowl when the Patriots defeated the Seattle Seahawks in Super Bowl XLIX at the end of the 2014 season.

In 2016, he was promoted to assistant quarterbacks coach, and helped coach rookie Jacoby Brissett and backup Jimmy Garoppolo. On February 5, 2017, Schuplinski was part of the Patriots coaching staff that won Super Bowl LI. In the game, the Patriots defeated the Atlanta Falcons by a score of 34–28 in overtime. Schuplinski won his third Super Bowl title when the Patriots defeated the Los Angeles Rams in Super Bowl LIII. He remained as assistant quarterbacks coach until the 2019 season.

Miami Dolphins
On February 8, 2019, Schuplinski was hired by the Miami Dolphins as their assistant quarterbacks coach under head coach Brian Flores.

New York Giants
On January 13, 2020, Schuplinski was hired by the New York Giants as their quarterbacks coach under his former Patriots co-worker Joe Judge. He was let go after the 2021 season.

Las Vegas Raiders
On March 7, 2022, the Las Vegas Raiders hired Schuplinski as their senior offensive assistant coach. The following year on March 8, 2023, he was promoted to tight ends coach

References

External links
 Miami Dolphins profile

Living people
1977 births
Case Western Spartans football coaches
High school football coaches in Ohio
John Carroll Blue Streaks football coaches
John Carroll Blue Streaks football players
Miami Dolphins coaches
New England Patriots coaches
New York Giants coaches
Sportspeople from Cuyahoga County, Ohio
Las Vegas Raiders coaches